This is a list of women writers who were born in Greece or whose writings are closely associated with that country.

A
Aganice Ainianos (1838–1892), poet
Elli Alexiou (1894–1988), novelist, short story writer, playwright, journalist
Loula Anagnostaki (1930–2017), playwright 
Marie Aspioti (1909–2000), Corfiote writer, playwright, poet, publisher, writing in English and Greek

B
Olga Broumas (born 1949), English-language poet, living in the United States

D
Emilia Dafni (1881–1941), poet, novelist
Penelope Delta (1874–1941), novelist, children's writer
Constance Dima (born 1948), poet, novelist, essayist, sometimes writing in French
Kiki Dimoula (1931–2020), poet
Maro Douka (born 1947), novelist, short story writer, playwright, memoirist

F
Justine Frangouli-Argyris (born 1959), journalist, non-fiction writer, living in Canada

G
Rhea Galanaki (born 1947), novelist
Evi Gkotzaridis, historian, author of Trials of Irish History (2007)
Katerina Gogou (1940–1993), poet, actress
Tatiana Gritsi-Milliex (1920–2005), novelist, journalist

H
Arianna Huffington (born 1950), Greek-born author, columnist, founder of The Huffington Post

K
Margarita Karapanou (1946–2008), novelist
Ioanna Karystiani (born 1952), novelist, poet, short story writer, screenwriter
Anna Komnene (1083–1153), Greek princess, author of the biographical Alexiad

L
Maria Laina (born 1947), widely translated poet, critic, translator
Angeliki Laiou (1941–2008), Byzantist historian

M
Jenny Mastoraki (born 1949), poet, translator
Melinno (2nd–1st century BCE), lyric poet
Antigone Metaxa-Krontera (1905–1972), children's writer
Rena Molho (born 1946), historian, works on Greek Jewish history
Doula Mouriki (1934–1991), art historian
Elizabeth Moutzan-Martinegou (1801–1832), poet, playwright and translator

P
Katina Papa (1903–1959), poet, novelist
Maria Papayanni (born 1964), children's writer
Maria Polydouri (1902–1930), poet

S
Georges Sari (1925–2012), novelist, children's writer, actress
Matilde Serao (1856–1927), Greek-born Italian journalist, novelist
Dido Sotiriou (1909–2004), novelist, journalist, playwright
Elisavet Spathari, archaeologist, author

T
Vicky Theodoropoulou (born 1958), journalist, novelist, non-fiction writer
Alkis Thrylos, pen name of Eleni Ourani (1896–1971), literary critic, non-fiction writer
Soti Triantafyllou (born 1957), short story writer, novelist, essayist, translator
Vasia Tzanakari (born 1980), novelist, translator

V
Helen Vlachos (1911–1995), acclaimed journalist, newspaper publisher, autobiographer

Y
Yovanna (born 1940), poet, novelist, songwriter, singer

Z
Alki Zei (1925–2020), novelist, children's writer
Zyranna Zateli (born 1951), novelist, short story writer, non-fiction writer

See also
List of women writers
List of Greek writers

References

-
Greek women writers, List of
Writers
Women writers, List of Greek